Daniel Perez (born August 8, 1993), professionally known as Bugz Ronin, is a Latin-American record producer and songwriter. He is best known for producing on Yung Bans' debut studio album Misunderstood (2019) and Lil Uzi Vert's second studio album Eternal Atake (2020), as well as producing for numerous other notable artists including Yeat and TyFontaine. He initially rose to prominence by producing a slew of tracks for Lil Uzi Vert. He is currently signed to Sony/ATV Music Publishing in a publishing deal.

Early life 
Daniel Perez was born on August 8, 1993, in Stroudsburg, Pennsylvania, where he also grew up and learned how to produce beats.

Career 
Ronin had been producing for several years before he met the manager of American rapper Lil Uzi Vert in 2016. He began sending music to his team over the next couple years. Many of these tracks were either released on SoundCloud or leaked. In 2019, Ronin would produce three tracks on Yung Bans debut studio album "Misunderstood". In 2020, Bugz's production would later be heavily featured on Lil Uzi Vert second studio album Eternal Atake.

Eternal Atake was a commercial success, debuting atop the US Billboard 200 with 288,000 album-equivalent units (including 9,000 pure album sales). The album earned more than 400 million US streams in its first week. This was Lil Uzi Vert's second US number-one album and remained number one on the Billboard 200 in its second week with 247,000 album-equivalent units. In that same week, Ronin signed with Sony/ATV Music Publishing.

Discography 
Credits derived from AllMusic and Genius

References

1994 births
Living people
American hip hop record producers
American rhythm and blues musicians
Emo rap musicians
FL Studio users
Record producers from Pennsylvania
People from Stroudsburg, Pennsylvania
Trap musicians